Arthur George Fox (September 9, 1878 – August 17, 1958) was an English-American fencer who competed in the 1904 Summer Olympics.

Taking up fencing as a sport in his native United Kingdom, he emigrated to the United States at some point. After his emigration to the US, in 1904, he won the silver medal in  team foil competition. He also competed in the individual foil event but was eliminated in the first round. In the individual sabre event he finished fifth.

He was born in Cowes, Isle of Wight, England and died in Los Angeles, California, USA.

References

External links
 profile

1878 births
1958 deaths
American male foil fencers
British emigrants to the United States
English male fencers
Fencers at the 1904 Summer Olympics
Olympic silver medalists for the United States in fencing
People from Cowes
Medalists at the 1904 Summer Olympics